Viktoras Pranckietis (born 26 July 1958) is a Lithuanian agronomist and politician. He was the speaker of the Seimas.

Early life and education
Pranckietis was born in Ruteliai village, near Tytuvėnai, in Kelmė District Municipality. He graduated from high school in Tytuvėnai in 1973 and continued studying there at an agricultural technical school, afterwards briefly working at a local farm as an agronomist. Between 1977 and 1982, Pranckietis studied at the Lithuanian Academy of Agriculture (now Aleksandras Stulginskis University), earning a degree in scientific agronomy. In 1998, he earned a doctoral degree in biomedicine.

Pranckietis spent most of his career working at the Lithuanian Academy of Agriculture, starting as a research assistant, and later working as the dean of the faculty of agronomy. He has written numerous scientific papers, books and textbooks, specializing in gardening and acted as a consultant on the subject for numerous specialized TV shows in Lithuania.

Political career
Pranckietis is a former member of the Lithuanian Farmers and Greens Union. Since 2014, he has served as the deputy chairman of the party. He first unsuccessfully ran for a seat in the Lithuanian parliament, the Seimas, in 2012, but was elected to the council of Kaunas District Municipality in 2015. In the parliamentary elections in October 2016, Pranckietis was elected to the parliament in the single-member constituency of Raudondvaris. With Lithuanian Farmers and Greens Union being the largest party in the parliament, Pranckietis was elected as the Speaker of the Seimas in November 2016. In 2018 and 2019, there were two attempts to have no confidence vote on Pranckietis' speakership, but none of them  prevailed.

Honours

Foreign honours
 : Knight Grand Cross of the Order of Merit of the Italian Republic (14 January 2019)
 : Grand Cross of the Order of Merit of the Republic of Poland (1 July 2019)

References

External links

1958 births
Living people
Lithuanian agronomists
People from Kelmė District Municipality
Speakers of the Seimas
21st-century Lithuanian politicians
Lithuanian Farmers and Greens Union politicians
Liberal Movement (Lithuania) politicians
Vytautas Magnus University Agriculture Academy alumni